Miha Golob (born 9 December 1980) is a Slovenian footballer.

He played for Ježica, Rudar Velenje, Dinamo Zagreb, Maribor, AEL Limassol, Aris Limassol, SV Wildon, and Murfeld.

See also
List of NK Maribor players

External sources
Stats from Slovenia at PrvaLiga 

1980 births
Living people
Slovenian footballers
Slovenian expatriate footballers
Association football midfielders
NK Rudar Velenje players
GNK Dinamo Zagreb players
NK Maribor players
Expatriate footballers in Cyprus
Slovenian expatriate sportspeople in Cyprus
AEL Limassol players
Aris Limassol FC players
Slovenian PrvaLiga players
Cypriot First Division players
Expatriate footballers in Austria
Slovenian expatriate sportspeople in Austria